Luke Charlesworth (born 4 February 1992) is a New Zealand male badminton player. In 2014, he became the champion at the New Zealand National Badminton Championships. He also won the 2013 New Caledonia International tournament in the men's doubles event and the runner-up in the singles event. At the Oceania Championships, he won the men's singles bronze in 2012 and silver in 2015.

Achievements

Oceania Championships
Men's Singles

BWF International Challenge/Series
Men's Singles

Men's Doubles

 BWF International Challenge tournament
 BWF International Series tournament
 BWF Future Series tournament

References

External links 
 

Living people
1992 births
Sportspeople from Auckland
New Zealand male badminton players
20th-century New Zealand people
21st-century New Zealand people